In the United States the unofficial beginning and ending dates of national economic expansions have been defined by an American private non-profit research organization known as the National Bureau of Economic Research (NBER).  The NBER defines an expansion as a period when economic activity rises substantially, spreads across the economy, and typically lasts for several years.

During the 19th century, the United States experienced frequent boom and bust cycles. This period was characterized by short, frequent periods of expansion, typically punctuated by periods of sharp recession. This cyclical pattern continued through the Great Depression. Economic growth since 1945 has been more stable with fewer recessions when compared to previous eras.

Great Depression onward 

Following the end of World War II and the large adjustment as the economy adjusted from wartime to peacetime in 1945, the collection of many economic indicators, such as unemployment and gross domestic product (GDP) became standardized.  Expansions after World War II may be compared to each other much more easily than previous expansions because of these available data. The listed dates and durations are from the official chronology of the National Bureau of Economic Research.

The National Bureau of Economic Research dates expansions on a monthly basis. From the trough of the recession of 1945 to the late-2000s recession, there have been eleven periods of expansion, lasting an average of fifty-nine months.

Included during this period is the post–World War II economic expansion through the 1973–75 recession, a period of stagflation between 1974 and 1981, and the Great Moderation from 1982 to the start of the late-2000s recession.

See also 
 List of recessions in the United States

External links 

 US Business Cycle Expansions and Contractions, 1857 to present, National Bureau of Economic Research

References 

Economic Expansions
Expanions
Economic growth